Jarlsberg is a former county of Norway.

Jarlsberg may also refer to:
 Counts of Wedel-Jarlsberg
 Jarlsberg cheese
 Jarlsberg Avis, a newspaper
 Jarlsberg (manor)
 Jarlsberg Travbane, a horse racing track
 Jarlsberg Tunnel
 Tønsberg Airport, Jarlsberg
 Vestfold was until 1919 known as Jarlsberg and Larvik County
 Wedel Jarlsberg Land in Svalbard